Sealed is a compilation boxed set by Yellow Magic Orchestra. Released to "seal" the band, it is a four-part release, with one record/tape with songs by each member of the band, plus one for group compositions. Each copy is numbered and contains two booklets containing comments by the band regarding their career and "spreading out", an illustrated discography and song lyrics; it also comes with a poster of the band and a "Spreading Out Commemorative Certificate". When reissued on CD in 1988, the set was pared down to just the songs and lyrics, the order of the discs was switched and it was full of typographical errors, as well as the omission of a few tracks.

Track listing

External links
Sealed at Discogs

Yellow Magic Orchestra albums
Alfa Records albums
1984 compilation albums